Card manipulation is the branch of magic that deals with creating effects using sleight of hand techniques involving playing cards. Card manipulation is often used in magical performances, especially in close-up, parlor, and street magic. Some of the most recognized names in this field include Dai Vernon, Tony Slydini, Ed Marlo, S.W. Erdnase, Richard Turner, John Scarne, and Ricky Jay. Before becoming world-famous for his escapes, Houdini billed himself as "The King of Cards".  Among the more well-known card tricks relying on card manipulation are Ambitious Card, and Three-card Monte, a common street hustle also known as Find the Lady.

History

Playing cards became popular with magicians in the 15th century as they were props which were inexpensive, versatile, and easily available. Card magic has blossomed into one of the most popular branches of magic, accumulating thousands of techniques and ideas. These range from complex mathematics like those used by Persi Diaconis, the use of psychological techniques like those taught by Banachek, to extremely difficult sleight of hand like that of Ed Marlo and Dai Vernon.

Card magic, in one form or another, likely dates from the time playing cards became commonly known, towards the second half of the fourteenth century, but its history in this period is largely undocumented. Compared to sleight of hand magic in general and to cups and balls, it is a new form of magic. However, due to its versatility as a prop it has become popular amongst modern magicians.

Martin Gardner called S.W. Erdnase's 1902 treatise on card manipulation Artifice, Ruse and Subterfuge at the Card Table: A Treatise on the Science and Art of Manipulating Cards "the most famous, the most carefully studied book ever published on the art of manipulating cards at gaming tables".

Technique
Illusions performed with playing cards are constructed using basic card manipulation techniques (or sleights). It is the intention of the performer that such sleights are performed in a manner which is undetectable to the audience—however, that result takes practice and a thorough understanding of method. Manipulation techniques include:

Lifts
Lifts are techniques which extract one or more cards from a deck. The produced card(s) are normally known to the audience, for example having previously been selected or identified as part of the illusion. In sleight of hand, a "double lift" can be made to extract two cards from the deck, but held together to appear as one card.

False deals
Dealing cards (for example at the start of a traditional card game) is considered a fair means of distributing cards. False deals are techniques which appear to deliver cards fairly, when actually the cards delivered are predetermined or known to the performer. False dealing techniques include: second dealing, bottom dealing, middle dealing, false counts (more or less cards are dealt than expected), and double dealing (the top and bottom cards of a small packet are dealt together).

Side slips  

Now known as the "side steal". A technique invented by magician F. W. Conradi. It is used to control a predetermined card to the top of a deck (most of the time).

Passes
The effect of the card pass is that an identified card is inserted somewhere into a deck. However, following rapid and concealed manipulation by the performer, it is secretly moved or displaced - usually to the top (or bottom) of the deck. A pass is achieved by swapping the portion of the deck from the identified card downwards, with the portion of the deck above the identified card. Pass techniques include: the classic pass, the invisible turn-over pass, the Zingone Perfect Table pass, the flesh grip pass, the jog pass, the Braue pass, the Charlier pass, the finger palm pass and the Hermann pass. Simply, a card pass is a secret cut of the deck (not to be confused with a coin pass which is a false transfer of a coin from one hand to the other).

Palming
Palming is a technique for holding or concealing one or more cards in the palm of the hand. Cards palmed from a deck are typically held in reserve (unseen by the audience) until production is required for the illusion being performed. Palming techniques include: the Braue diagonal tip-up, the swing, the thumb-count, face card palm, the crosswise, new vertical, the gamblers' squaring, the gamblers' flat, the Hugard top palm, the flip-over, the Hofzinser bottom, the Braue bottom, the Tenkai palm and the Zingone bottom.

False shuffles
Shuffling cards is considered a fair means to randomize the cards contained in a deck. False shuffles are techniques which appear to fairly shuffle a deck, when actually the cards in the deck are maintained in an order appropriate to the illusion being performed. False shuffles can be performed that permit one or more cards to be positioned in a deck, or even for the entire deck to remain in an unshuffled state (for example the state the deck was in before the shuffle). False shuffle techniques include: the perfect riffle, the strip-out, the Hindu shuffle, the gamblers', and various stock shuffling techniques (where the locations of one or more cards are controlled during the false shuffle).

False cuts
Cutting a deck of cards is a technique whereby the deck is split into two portions (the split point being randomly determined – often by a member of the audience), which are then swapped – the effect being to make sure that no one is sure of which card is on the top of the deck. False cuts are techniques whereby the performer appears to organise a fair cut, when actually a predetermined card (or cards) is organised to be located on the top of the deck. False cutting techniques include: the false running cut, and the gambler's false cut.

Color change
A color change is the effect of changing one card to another in front of the spectator's eyes. Usually the cards changed are of different colors, or a face card into a number card, in order to make the change more apparent. There are many different techniques to accomplish this effect, but among the most common are the classic color change and the snap change, as they are easier to master than others. Professional magicians usually perform other color changes such as the Cardini or Erdnase change.

Crimps
Crimps are techniques whereby part of a card is intentionally physically marked, creased, or bent to facilitate identification during an illusion. Crimp techniques include: the regular crimp, the gamblers' crimp, the breather crimp and the peek crimp.

Jogs
A jog is one or more cards which protrude slightly from somewhere within a deck or stack of cards. The protrusion, although not noticeable to the audience, permits the performer to retain knowledge about the location of the card during other manipulations. While jogs are not always hidden from the audience, they are most often. Some varieties include "in jogs", "side jogs", and "out jogs".

Reverses
Card reverses are techniques whereby one or more cards in a deck are made to change their orientation, for example from face up to face down.

Forces
Card forces are the sleight which involves forcing a spectator to choose a card that has been predetermined by the performer, while maintaining supposed free choice. Some forces include; the classic force, the riffle force, and the slip force.

See also
List of card manipulation techniques
Card flourish
Card marking
Card sharp
Card throwing
Sleight of hand
Trick deck

References
Citations

Sources

External links

The Royal Road to Card Magic, 1999
Magic Tricks with Cards Photo Feature, Havana Times, June 22, 2010

Card tricks
Object manipulation
Physical activity and dexterity toys